Addis Ababa City Football Club (Amharic: አዲስ አበባ ከተማ እግር ኳስ ክለብ) is an Ethiopian football club based in Addis Ababa. They currently play in the Ethiopian Higher League, the 2nd tier of football in Ethiopia.

History 
The club was promoted to the Ethiopian Premier League, the top tier of football in Ethiopia, after the end of the 2015-16 season. However, the success was short lived as a poor 2016-17 campaign saw the club being relegated back to the Ethiopian Higher League.

Ownership 
The club is funded and run by the local city government.

Controversy and Disputes 
During the 2016-17 season the club was accused of mistreatment after allegedly refusing to facilitate two Cameroon players way back to Cameroon after aborted trials.

References

Football clubs in Addis Ababa